The 1998 United States Senate election in California was held November 3, 1998. Incumbent Democratic Senator Barbara Boxer won re-election to a second term.

Democratic primary

Candidates 
 Barbara Boxer, incumbent U.S. Senator
 John Pinkerton

Results

Republican primary

Candidates 
 John M. Brown, businessman
 Linh Dao, activist
 Matt Fong, State Treasurer and nominee for State Controller in 1990
 Darrell Issa, businessman, activist
 Mark Raus, pharmacist
 Frank Riggs, U.S. Representative

Results

Other primaries

General election

Candidates 
 Ophie C. Beltran (PF)
 Barbara Boxer (D), incumbent U.S. Senator
 Ted Brown (L), perennial candidate
 Timothy R. Erich (Reform)
 Matt Fong (R), State Treasurer
 Joseph Perrin, Sr. (American Independent)
 Brian M. Rees (Natural Law)

Results 
Although the race was predicted to be fairly close, Boxer still defeated Fong by a ten-point margin. As expected, Boxer did very well in Los Angeles County and the San Francisco Bay Area.

Results by county 
Final results from the Secretary of State of California.

See also 
 1998 United States Senate elections

References

External links 
 JoinCalifornia 1998 General Election
 SmartVoter.org page on the California Senate race.

United States Senate
1998
California
United States Senate